Fahad Abdulrahman Badar (born 1979) is a Qatari banker & mountaineer. He is the first Arab to summit two of the highest mountains in the world, Mount Everest and Mount Lhotse, in a single expedition.

Early life
Badar was born in Doha, Qatar. He holds a bachelor’s degree in Banking & Finance from Bangor University and an MBA from Durham University in the United Kingdom.

Mountain climbing career
In May 2018, Badar reached the summit of Mount Kilimanjaro and in the same year he climbed Mount Elbrus.

On 23 May 2019, he climbed Mount Everest and Mount Lhotse to become the first Arab to do this double summit in a single expedition. In August 2019, he climbed Mont Blanc and Matterhorn.

In December 2020, Badar climbed Mount Ama Dablam.

In July 2021, he climbed Broad Peak mountain in Pakistan and during the expedition he lost four fingers to severe frostbite. Badar reached the summit of Mount K2 in July 2022.

See also
Nirmal Purja
Mohammed bin Abdulla Al Thani
Asma Al Thani

References

External links 
 

Living people
Alumni of Bangor University
Alumni of Durham University
Qatari bankers
Summiters of Mount Everest
People from Doha
1979 births